Zhuanghe is one of the two "northern county-level cities", the other being Wafangdian, under the administration of Dalian, located in the south of Liaoning province, People's Republic of China.

Geography and climate
It borders Donggang City to the east, Pulandian City to the west, Gaizhou City and Xiuyan Manchu Autonomous County to the north, and Changhai County in the Yellow Sea to the south.

Zhuanghe has a monsoon-influenced humid continental climate (Köppen Dwa), with long, cold, but dry winters, and humid and very warm summers. Due to the location on the Liaodong Peninsula, there is a seasonal delay in spring and summer, and extremes in heat are moderated; however, low temperatures peak in July. Precipitation is generous but a majority of the annual total falls in July and Average. There is an average 2,415.6 hours of bright sunshine annually, and the frost-free period averages 165 days.

Administrative divisions
There are 5 subdistricts, 15 towns, 4 townships, and 2 ethnic townships under the city's administration:

Subdistricts (街道)

Chengguan Subdistrict
Xinhua Subdistrict
Xingda Subdistrict
Changsheng Subdistrict
Mingyang Subdistrict

Towns (镇)

Townships (乡)

Anzishan Township
Buyunshan Township
Landian Township
Shicheng Township (Shihcheng)

Ethnic Townships

Taipingling Manchu Ethnic Township
Guiyunhua Manchu Ethnic Township

Demography

Transportation

Zhuanghe Bus Station
Zhuanghe Railway Station
Zhuanghe Port
China National Highway 201, running parallel to G15 and through downtown
China National Highway 305, of which Zhuanghe is the terminus, provides access to the interior of the Liaodong Peninsula, Yingkou, and points beyond before terminating at Linxi, Inner Mongolia.
G11 Hegang–Dalian Expressway, the main road to central Dalian, passing to the north of downtown

Economy

A base of the national commodity grain, Zhuanghe has very abundant agricultural and natural resources. Besides, it is one of the most important fruit bases in eastern Liaodong Peninsula. The Port of Zhuanghe is under construction.

Zhuanghe is also increasingly promoting its furniture manufacturing industry. The Huafeng Furniture Manufacturing Company has been one of the largest furniture manufacturing companies all over the country.

The Huayuankou Industrial Zone in the westernmost part of Zhuanghe City is one of  "Five Points, One Line" projects of the province.

Sightseeing
The tourism has gradually developed to be rising support structure in the county.

 Chengshan Ancient Town
 Bingyu Valley: Guilin of northern China
 Yinshitan National Forest Park
 Sea King Nine Islands
 Xianrendong National Nature Reserve

Gallery

References

External links
Zhuanghe Government website
Dalian Government website

Districts of Dalian
Cities in Liaoning